is the pen name of , a Japanese writer.

Inspired by Yukio Mishima, who tried to stage a coup d'état among Japan Self-Defense Forces then committed suicide after the coup was failed, Asada enlisted in the SDF after finishing his studies.  He changed jobs many times while endeavoring to find writing opportunities, submitting his works to literary competitions. In 1991, his novel Torarete tamaruka! (とられてたまるか!) started his literary career.  After writing several picaresque novels, his novel Metro ni notte (地下鉄に乗って) was awarded the Eiji Yoshikawa Prize for New Writers and made into a 2006 film; a short story collection The Stationmaster and other stories was also awarded the Naoki Prize.  He writes not only standard fiction and picaresque novels, but also historical and Chinese historical novels such as The Firmament of the Pleiades (Sōkyū no subaru, 蒼穹の昴). He is seen  as an author who has continued the traditional style of Japanese popular fiction.

Career
Asada was born in Tokyo on 13 December 1951.  One of his ancestors was a samurai who belonged to the Tokugawa shogunate. After graduating from Suginami High School, which is attached to Chuo University, he enlisted in the Japan Self-Defense Forces because of Mishima Yukio, though he initially denied this. 

His novels often depict Yakuza and it has been said that in this respect, they are autobiographical - Asada has admitted that he was once connected to a gang, specifically someone who ran businesses to raise funds for organised crime. Asada was connected to a "Nezumi kou" (a pyramid scheme fraud).  However, Asada has denied ever having been an actual member of a gangster organization. There was a period when he lived on money earned from gambling, and thus he has written many essays related to horse racing.

In 1991, Asada became known for his novel Torarete tamaruka! (とられてたまるか!). This novel was his first work that passed through a preliminary selection of a literary prize for new writers, so he took his pen name after this novel's protagonist.

Because of the picaresque nature of his early works, Asada has often been described as a picaresque writer. However, after winning the Eiji Yoshikawa Prize for New Writers for Metro ni notte (地下鉄に乗って) in 1995, his style and range of writing changed and expanded dramatically. His historical novel The Firmament of the Pleiades (Sōkyū no subaru, 蒼穹の昴), which vividly described the last stages of the Qing dynasty, was nominated for the Naoki prize of 1996.

Literary style
Asada claims that his ancestor was a samurai who belonged to the former Tokugawa shogunate (according to the Yomiuri Shinbun 16 October 1996). He wrote Mibu Gishi Den (壬生義士伝) based on the stories of the Shinsen Gumi (新撰組) and Ohara meshi mase (お腹召しませ).  He describes himself as Shōsetsu no taishū shokudō (小説の大衆食堂) meaning that he is a "cheap public restaurant", delivering any topic that the public wants. He also says that writing is the best hobby for him; consequently he has written more than 70 works in his 14 years of novelist activity, and is still eager to publish new novels. Regarding his modern novels, Asada is nicknamed "Heisei no nakase ya" (平成の泣かせ屋), meaning that he is good at moving readers to tears.

Asada acknowledges that he is a heavy smoker, and asserted the rights of the smoker in an essay "Yūki rin-rin ruri no iro" (勇気凛凛ルリの色). Further, every kind of gambling is his hobby, in addition to the horse racing as mentioned above, so there are essays related to gambling such as "Oh my Gah!" (オー・マイ・ガアッ!) and "Casino!" (カッシーノ!).

Works in English translation
 Short story collection
The Stationmaster (original title: Poppoya), trans. Terry Gallagher (VIZ Media, 2009 / Shueisha English Edition, 2013)
The Stationmaster (original title: Poppoya)
Love Letter (original title: Rabu retā)
Devil (original title: Akuma)
In Tsunohazu (original title: Tsunohazu nite)
Kyara (original title: Kyara)
The Festival of Lanterns (original title: Urabon'e)
No-Good Santa (original title: Rokudenashi no santa)
Invitation from the Orion Cinema (original title: Orion-za kara no shōtaijō)

Awards
 1995 - 16th Yoshikawa Eiji Prize for New Writers for Metro ni notte (地下鉄に乗って).
 1997 - 16th Japanese adventure fiction association special prize and 117th Naoki Prize for The Stationmaster and other stories (short story collection).
 2000 - Shibata Renzaburo prize for Mibu Gishi Den (壬生義士伝, When the Last Sword Is Drawn ) and best dresser prize of Japan.
 2006 - 1st Chuo Koron literature prize for Ohara meshi mase (お腹召しませ) and 10th Shiba Ryotaro prize.

Film adaptations
Japanese films
 Poppoya (The Stationmaster)
 When the Last Sword Is Drawn

South Korean film
 Failan (Love Letter)

References

External links
 J'Lit | Authors : Jiro Asada | Books from Japan 

1951 births
Living people
20th-century Japanese novelists
21st-century Japanese novelists
Japanese male short story writers
Writers from Tokyo
Japan Ground Self-Defense Force personnel
Japanese racehorse owners and breeders
Recipients of the Medal with Purple Ribbon
Naoki Prize winners
20th-century Japanese short story writers
21st-century Japanese short story writers
20th-century Japanese male writers
21st-century male writers